Zidan or more formally Zaydan is a given name and family name in various cultures. As an Arabic name it is also romanised as Zidane or Zeidan. As a Chinese given name, it can be written in various ways (e.g. ), with different meanings depending on the component Chinese characters.

People with the patronymic or family name Zidan include:

Al Walid ben Zidan (died 1636), sultan of Morocco
Gregor Židan (born 1965), Slovenian football player
Mohamed Zidan (born 1981), Egyptian football player
Raed Zidan (born 1971), first Palestinian mountaineer to summit Mount Everest
Ibrahim Mahdy Achmed Zeidan, Libyan man detained at Guantanamo Bay from 2002 to 2007

People with the given name Zidan include:
Zaydan An-Nasser (died 1627), sultan of Morocco
Cao Zhen (died 231), style name Zidan, military general under Cao Cao
Donnie Yen (Zhen Zidan, born 1965), Hong Kong actor
Zidan Saif (c. 1974 – 2004), Israeli Druze policeman killed in the 2014 Jerusalem synagogue massacre
Zeydan Karalar (born 1958), mayor of Adana

See also 
 Zayd (name), also spelled Zaydan
 Zidane (name)
 Zidani (disambiguation)

Arabic-language surnames
Arabic masculine given names
Chinese given names